Familie Heinz Becker is a German television series that aired from 1992 through 2004. The show revolves around the lives of Heinz Becker and his family, as well as those of neighbors and onlookers, although the focus of the series changed over the course of the series. In the first season, much of the humor was derived from Heinz's petty behavior; the character of his wife, Hilde, was not played for laughs. During seasons 2–4, Hilde's character became more naive but was devoted; much of the humor came from family dialogues. After Season 4, the focus shifted more to public life. Seasons 6 and 7 are not as well esteemed by critics as they repeat a number of older jokes and much of the comedy came from awkward situations, misspeaking, and other more mainstream comedic elements.

As one of the first TV programmes regularly to broadcast the Saarland accent with elements of dialect ("Saarpfälzisch") throughout Germany, it has been seen as contributing to the recognition of the regional culture.

Episode list

External links
 

1992 German television series debuts
2004 German television series endings
German comedy television series
German-language television shows
Das Erste original programming